The 1983 Cheltenham Council election took place on 5 May 1983 to elect members of Cheltenham Borough Council in Gloucestershire, England. The whole council was up for election on new boundaries. The Conservatives fell one seat short of a majority, meaning the council stayed in no overall control.

After the election, the composition of the council was
Conservative 16
SDP–Liberal Alliance 12
Residents Associations 3
Labour 1
Independent Conservative 1

Election result

Ward results

Margaret Heapey was a sitting councillor in St Paul's ward.

References

Cheltenham
Cheltenham Borough Council elections